Swordbearer is a fantasy role-playing game. It was originally published by Heritage Games in 1982, and then republished by Fantasy Games Unlimited in 1985. The game was written by B. Dennis Sustare with contributions from Arnold Hendrick. Illustrations are by Denis Loubet and David Helber. The Heritage edition cover art was by Helber; the FGU edition's cover art was by Bill Willingham.

Publication history
Swordbearer was designed by B. Dennis Sustare with Arnold Hendrick, featuring art by Denis Loubet. It was first published in 1982 by Heritage USA as a digest-sized box with three digest-sized books (two 48 pages, one 32 pages), a character sheet, and dice.

Fantasy Games Unlimited (FGU) purchased the rights to Swordbearer, and also picked up the old stock of the game from Heritage, which FGU's Scott Bizar felt should be a necessary part of the deal. In 1985 FGU republished the game in the same format with new cover art by Bill Willingham; later that year, FGU published a second edition as a boxed set containing two books (one 60 pages and one 32 pages).

Contents
Swordbearer is a fantasy system with some innovative ideas. Characters have no classes or professions, instead learning whatever skills are appropriate from six different "spheres" of skills. In this moneyless system, successful characters increase in social status, automatically gaining whatever material benefits their status confers. Playing out of character can result in loss of social status. Magic is based on elemental summoning and spirit control. The "Characters" and "Fighting" book (48 pages) included character creation, skills, equipment, and combat. The "Elemental Magic" and "Spirit Magic" book (32 pages) describes the magic system in detail. The "Racial Index" and "Gamemaster's Guide" book (48 pages) covers intelligent races, monsters, and how to run the game.

Innovations
The game broke a lot of ground. Among its innovations were:
 Instead of classes, every character has skill specializations (normally two) such as Fighting, Magic, Stealth, Town, Country, Arts & Crafts, etc. Within those specializations, they learn skill more efficiently, but everyone can learn every skill.
 Wealth is measured not by money but by Social Status.
 Encumbrance is drastically simplified. Every character can have 10 "items", no more or less, although the definition of an "item" is loose: an "item" could be a retainer, a castle plus all its attendants, etc.
 There are a very large number of playable character races: the usual elves, dwarves, humans, etc., plus unusual races such as dragons, centaurs, gargoyles, etc. and original races like bunrabs (humanoid rabbits) and moonspiders (intelligent arachnids).
 Magic is done with "nodes", aligned to various elemental or spiritual forces. Each node's power can be linked to a specific spell. The elemental forces are somewhat similar to the Chinese Five Elements theory, with Crystal, Light/Dark, Wood, Metal, Fire, Water and Wind. Spiritual types are Vitriolic, Phlegmatic, Choleric and Melancholic. This serves to give the magic system a lot of "flavor".  Additionally the node system was innovative in that a given spell would require a certain size node, and substituting several smaller nodes would not suffice (so if a fireball needed a 3-node of fire, you needed a 3-node or larger, not three 1-nodes).  The nodes could be temporarily or permanently exhausted randomly upon being used in a spell rather than expended allowing the magic using character to recover the node after a short period.  This changed the magic point system from a strict exchange method to a variable resource for the spell caster.  The game master could also adjust game balance somewhat by increasing or decreasing the availability of specific size and types of nodes.
 There is no additional system for religious magic. Priests are assumed to either use the spiritual or elemental systems, or to be wise but not actually capable of magic.
 Combat initiative is determined by skill. Every weapon has both an Accuracy and Speed skill; attacks are carried out in descending order by Speed skill.

Differences between the Heritage and FGU editions
The Heritage and FGU games are almost exactly alike in terms of content. Game art, text, etc. are the same save for a larger number of typos in the FGU edition.

The physical form of the two editions is the largest difference. The Heritage edition comes in a 7x8" box, containing three rule volumes plus a character sheet. Each volume contains two books:

 Characters
 Fighting
 Elemental Magic
 Spirit Magic
 Racial Index
 Gamemasters Guide

In the FGU edition, the rules are presented in two books, with smaller sections (Introduction; Creating a Character; Skills, Experience and Activity Spheres; etc.). Books I-IV of the Heritage edition are contained in Book One of the FGU version; books V-VI of the Heritage edition make up Book Two of the FGU edition.

Market appeal
In its Heritage edition, the game did not sell well, perhaps because of its unusual packaging: a 7x8" box in landscape orientation, it looked more like a set of miniatures rules than an RPG. When republished by FGU, the game came in a more traditional letter-size form. Its lack of success under Heritage may also have been due to its innovations, or to Heritage's lack of renown as an RPG company.

Even so, under FGU the game languished. One supplement was published, but nothing further was done with the game. This may have been because of FGU's focus on Chivalry & Sorcery, its primary fantasy RPG, or because of the unusual nature of Swordbearer's rules.

Supplements
Under FGU, Swordbearer got its first supplement: Dwarven Halls, which details the dwarves and other inhabitants of a long valley. The valley is designed to be transplanted into any campaign setting—almost no mention is made of the world outside the valley—so the supplement is in some ways universal.

Review
Dragon #71
Different Worlds #27

References

External links

 Fantasy Games Unlimited official website

Fantasy role-playing games
Fantasy Games Unlimited games
Heritage Models games
Role-playing games introduced in 1982